The 1940–41 Svenska Serien season was the sixth season of the Svenska Serien, the top level ice hockey league in Sweden. Hammarby IF won their third straight league title.

Regular season
In a change of format from previous seasons, the 8 teams all played each other once, after which they split into an upper group and a lower group based on their performance in the first 7 matches.  They then played an additional match against each of the other three teams in their half, resulting in a 10-game season.

External links
1940-41 season

Svenska Serien (ice hockey) seasons
Swe
1940–41 in Swedish ice hockey